Events in 1983 in Japanese television.

Debuts

Ongoing
Music Fair, music (1964–present)
Mito Kōmon, jidaigeki (1969–2011)
Sazae-san, anime (1969–present)
Ōedo Sōsamō, anime (1970–1984)
Ōoka Echizen, jidaigeki (1970–1999)
FNS Music Festival, music (1974–present)
Panel Quiz Attack 25, game show (1975–present)
Doraemon, anime (1979–2005)
Dr. Slump - Arale-chan, anime (1981–1986)
Urusei Yatsura, anime (1981–1986)

Endings

See also
1983 in anime
List of Japanese television dramas
1983 in Japan
List of Japanese films of 1983

References